The 1954–55 Sussex County Football League season was the 30th in the history of the competition.

Division 1 featured now increased to seventeen teams with Hove White Rovers being promoted from Division 2 and Southwick re-joining. Division 2 featured eleven teams from which the winners would be promoted into Division 1.

Division One
The division featured 17 clubs, 15 which competed in the last season, along with two new clubs:
 Hove White Rovers, promoted from last season's Division Two
Southwick, joined from Metropolitan League

League table

Division Two
The division featured 11 clubs, 9 which competed in the last season, along with two new clubs:
APV Athletic
Chichester United

League table

References

1954-55
9